Madison E. Hollister (1808–1896) was a justice on the Idaho Territory's supreme court. U. S. President Ulysses S. Grant promoted him to Chief Justice in 1874. He succeeded David Noggle as Chief Justice. John Clark was appointed to succeed Hollister as Associate Justice. Hollister served as Chief Justice of the Idaho Territorial Court from January 14, 1875 to January 13, 1879.

He was born in New York. In 1874 he was serving as an Associate Justice on Idaho Territory's Supreme Court. In 1876, as Chief Justice, he was documented as living in Malade City. W. C. Whiston and Joseph Clarke were Associate Justices. He was part of the National Reform Association that sought an amendment to the U.S. Constitution to make it a Christian nation. In 1879, after his second term as Chief Justice, U.S. president Rutherford B. Hayes decided not to retain him for another term and appointed William George Thompson of Iowa to succeed him.

In 2014 a collection of Hollister's documents was auctioned including diaries from his times as U.S. Consul at Buenos Aires in the Argentine Republic and his travels on the Paraná River and Paraguay River. He was appointed to the post in 1866 by Andrew Johnson.

References

1808 births
1896 deaths
Justices of the Idaho Supreme Court